Serene Oasis is a garden adopting horticulture as a new emerging approach of therapy in Hong Kong. Its major goal is to improve the condition of people suffering from mental illnesses such as dementia and depression. Besides, the organization is also committed to promoting horticulture and green life in Hong Kong. It provides professional training programmes of horticulture and courses for planting. The rate of depression among senior citizens in Hong Kong has been increasing, so Serene Oasis aims to build up diversified therapeutic services to cope with the worsening mental health of people.

History
Serene Oasis is an affiliate of the Christian Family Service Centre (CFSC). With the approval of the government, the board of directors secured the support in launching a project occupying around 7,000 square of land in the midst of the urban area. In 2010, Serene Oasis was set up at 2A Kwun Tong Road in Choi Hung. And up to May 2013, around 850 patients have their mental conditions improved by the therapeutic services. What’s more, around 270 people had received certification of horticultural therapy through the training programmes.

Features
Serene Oasis advocates green life in Hong Kong. It aims to enable people to appreciate the greenness of nature and experience the fun of planting in the urban city.

Meanwhile, the site was regarded as a pioneer to promote horticultural therapy, which is a new type of treatment from the developed countries. Through creating experiences and activities related to nature, horticultural therapy has a positive impact on patients’ recovery from mental or physical problems.

Horticultural therapy's design for clients
In the horticultural therapy, Serene Oasis owned around 100 types of plants, which are used to shape a natural environment for the enhancement of clients' sensual experience. With the immersion in nature using human's five senses, it is expected that the participants can acquire a sense of calm and comfort in the process. For instance, the sound of trickle renders an aural experience of the flowing water; the vanilla may stimulate the sense of touch and smell when its light fragrance flows into the lungs. Moreover, the sense of taste may also be stimulated with plants like passion fruits. All these are to cultivate a peaceful mind for patients.

Concepts
Plants have life just like human beings. Generally speaking, their life processes include seed germination, stem elongation, flower development and maturity, which also require human effort to look after. This treatment focuses on the interaction between people and plants. From the stage of sowing, nurturing, irrigation to growth, from the sapling to the well-developed form, participants are given a chance to witness the plants' growth and thus attain a sense of achievement. Furthermore, participants can acquire the knowledge regarding the life cycle of plants and know more about farming.

Operation

Funding
Recently, Serene Oasis is basically relying on four sources of capital for operation. The sources include revenues from some of the activities it organizes, sponsorships from the business community, donation from the public, as well as the monetary support from some regular donors.

Challenges
Though with the generous support from various parties, Serene Oasis faced several challenges in its operation and future development.

First, it has only a limited number of staff to manage the enormous site. Therefore, it is facing a shortage of workers. In light of this, the site and organization organized training programmes to recruit volunteers. The duties of the volunteers include taking care of the growing plants, facilitating the horticultural therapy and teaching some DIY handcraft workshops etc. Serene Oasis requires their volunteers to be keen on farming, helpful, and to be willing to share his/her own knowledge and skills with other community members, so that they can help reduce the burden of the existing staff.

On top of the training programmes, as a social organization, Serene Oasis also recruited volunteers from the collaborative projects with several popular corporations centering their businesses in Hong Kong, such as Bossini and Town Gas. From these collaborations, not only the site can receive assistance, but the corporations may also enhance the cohesion of their labours.

Besides recruiting volunteers to complete the necessary work, experts were also being invited to the site and help with the technical part of the operation. For example, when Serene Oasis was still under its early stage of development, professors from the Biology field went to give advice on the growth of plants, and experts from the architecture field were invited to help with the design and construction of the small farmlands. Therefore, with the assistance from the members in the community, Serene Oasis can generally maintain its operation without excessive monetary burden.

The second factor restricting the development of Serene Oasis is the limitation of land utilization. Due to the fact that the urban land is limited, it is necessary to make an efficient disposition of land. Although the land in Serene Oasis is already being highly utilized, it is not yet enough for further developing their activities in order to expand the range of social services.

The third one is the lack of experts specializing in horticultural therapy. Since this therapy is still a rather new developing type of treatment in Hong Kong, there are not so many specialists in this field. As a results, it is difficult for Serene Oasis to have more professionals and improve the efficiency of their therapy.

Transportation
Serene Oasis is west to, and several minutes’ walk from, the A2 exit of the Choi Hung station. An underpass outside the station is available for steps to Serene Oasis. It is located just between the underpass and the Richland Gardens.
Lying above the underpass is the Kwun Tong Road where the bus and minibus stops are located. They are reachable through bus routes number 101R, 101, 107, 11B, 11D, 13D, 14, 16, 17, 1A, 24, 28, 2A, 5D, 302, 296C, 297, 302, 40, 796B, 93K, A22, N121, N29, N293, N796, R22 and X22, and through minibus routes number 46, 102, 102B and 111.

See also
 Horticulture therapy
 Mental disease

References

External links

 American Horticultural Therapy Association 
 Serene Oasis
 Horticultural therapy 
 Hong Kong Horticultural Therapy Center
 Christian Family Service Centre

Gardens in Hong Kong
Ngau Chi Wan